Mr. Payback: An Interactive Movie is a 1995 American science-fiction/adventure/comedy short film written and directed by Bob Gale.

Designed as an interactive movie, it comprises slightly over two hours of footage, approximately 20 minutes of which is seen in each viewing. It requires the audience to vote for various directions the story will take, using a joystick attached to the armrests of their seats. A special LaserDisc-based machine in the projection booth was designed to make instantaneous edits as the story unfolded. The film took up four CAV LaserDiscs.

The film stars an android (Billy Warlock) who, in a number of possible storylines, takes action by humiliating or attacking people who have committed crimes or have done wrong in the past. Gale and Christopher Lloyd, who had previously worked on the Back to the Future trilogy, worked on this film as well, and the music was scored by Michael Tavera, who had composed the music for the animated Back to the Future series.

The movie billed itself as "the world's first interactive movie," but it was predated by 1992's I'm Your Man and 1967's Kinoautomat.

Plot  
Mr. Payback is a vigilante android who takes action against multiple criminals, troublemakers, and general nuisances; all of whom are the focus of their respective scenes. Whenever Mr. Payback encounters a criminal, the film's audience votes on three different ways that he can humiliate or punish them. Some of these ways include: 
 Upsetting a selfish "Car Jerk" by slowly disassembling his car (for taking a handicapped parking space)
 Setting a bike thief's clothes on fire (for removing and stealing parts from another person's bike)
 Eating a gang member's knife (for threatening/daring the protagonist)

There is one sequence in the film where the audience can choose to subject Mr. Payback himself to their choices.

The film culminates in a game show sequence called Payback Time, where three previous antagonists, such as the Car Jerk, are brought back and humiliated in various challenges that are selected by the audience. At the beginning of the segment, the audience chooses whether Paul Anka or Ice-T makes a special guest appearance.

Cast
Billy Warlock as Payton Bach (Mr. Payback)
Holly Fields as Gwen
Bruce McGill as James Konklin
Christopher Lloyd as Ed Jarvis
Leslie Easterbrook as Diane Wyatt
David Correia as Raoul Alvarez
Victor Love as Lloyd Braxton
Carol-Ann Plante as Cara Cook
Michael Talbott as Car Jerk
Brendan Ford as Park Vandal
Gilbert Rosales as Bike Thief
Eddie Deezen as Phil the Guard
Robby Sutton as Moe
Sasha Jenson as Larry
Joseph D. Reitman as Dick

Critical reception
Mr. Payback received negative reviews from critics. Roger Ebert of the Chicago Sun Times gave the film a half-star out of a possible four, and called it "the kind of film where horrified parents might encourage the kids to shout at the screen, hoping the noise might drown out the flood of garbage." He and Gene Siskel both commented that while the concept of combining film with interactivity has possibilities, they are not explored by Mr. Payback, which centers on bathroom humor and appeals to the audience's most sadistic urges. Ty Burr of Entertainment Weekly tagged the film with an "F" grade.

References

External links 
 
   (Article on Mr. Payback)

1995 films
Interactive films
Films scored by Michael Tavera
Films with screenplays by Bob Gale
1990s English-language films